Band of Brothers is a 2001 American war drama miniseries based on historian Stephen E. Ambrose's 1992 non-fiction book of the same name. It was created by Steven Spielberg and Tom Hanks, who also served as executive producers, and who had collaborated on the 1998 World War II film Saving Private Ryan. Episodes first aired on HBO starting on September 9, 2001. The series  won the Emmy and Golden Globe awards for best miniseries.

The series dramatizes the history of "Easy" Company, 2nd Battalion, 506th Parachute Infantry Regiment of the 101st Airborne Division, from jump training in the United States through its participation in major actions in Europe, up until Japan's capitulation and the end of World War II. The events are based on Ambrose's research and recorded interviews with Easy Company veterans. The series took some literary license, adapting history for dramatic effect and series structure. The characters portrayed are based on members of Easy Company. Excerpts from interviews with some of the survivors are used as preludes to the episodes, but they are not identified by name until the end of the finale.

The title of the book and series comes from the St Crispin's Day Speech in William Shakespeare's play Henry V, delivered by King Henry before the Battle of Agincourt. Ambrose quotes a passage from the speech on his book's first page; this passage is spoken by Carwood Lipton in the series finale.

Plot
Band of Brothers is a dramatized account of "Easy Company", part of the 2nd Battalion, 506th Parachute Infantry Regiment, assigned to the United States Army's 101st Airborne Division during World War II. Over ten episodes the series details the company's exploits during the war.

Starting with jump training at Camp Toccoa, Georgia, Band of Brothers follows the unit through the American airborne landings in Normandy, Operation Market Garden, the Siege of Bastogne, the invasion of Germany, including the liberation of a concentration camp, and on to the war's end. It includes the taking of the Kehlsteinhaus (Eagle's Nest) at Obersalzberg in Berchtesgaden and refers to the surrender of Japan.

Major Richard Winters (1918–2011) is the central character, shown working to accomplish the company's missions and keep his men together and safe. While the series features a large ensemble cast, each episode generally focuses on a single character, following his action.

As the series is based on historic events, the fates of the characters reflect those of the persons on which they are based. Many either die or sustain serious wounds which lead to their being sent home. Other soldiers recover after treatment in field hospitals and rejoin their units on the front line. Their experiences, and the moral, mental, and physical hurdles they must overcome, are central to the story's narrative.

Episodes

Cast and characters

Since Band of Brothers focuses entirely on the exploits of "E" (Easy) Company during World War II, the series features a large ensemble cast.

Main cast

 Kirk Acevedo as Staff Sergeant Joe Toye
 Eion Bailey as Private First Class David Kenyon Webster
 Michael Cudlitz as Staff Sergeant Denver "Bull" Randleman
 Dale Dye as Colonel Robert Sink
 Rick Gomez as Technician Fourth Grade George Luz
 Scott Grimes as Technical Sergeant Donald Malarkey
 Frank John Hughes as Staff Sergeant William "Wild Bill" Guarnere
 Damian Lewis as Major Richard "Dick" Winters
 Ron Livingston as Captain Lewis Nixon
 James Madio as Technician Fourth Grade Frank Perconte
 Neal McDonough as First Lieutenant Lynn "Buck" Compton
 Rene L. Moreno as Technician Fifth Grade Joseph Ramirez
 David Schwimmer as Captain Herbert Sobel
 Richard Speight, Jr. as Sergeant Warren "Skip" Muck
 Donnie Wahlberg as Second Lieutenant Carwood Lipton
 Matthew Settle as Captain Ronald Speirs
 Douglas Spain as Technician Fifth Grade Antonio C. Garcia
 Rick Warden as First Lieutenant Harry Welsh
 Marc Warren as Private Albert Blithe
 Shane Taylor as Technician Fourth Grade Eugene "Doc" Roe
 Dexter Fletcher as Staff Sergeant John "Johnny" Martin
 Colin Hanks as First Lieutenant Henry S. Jones
 Ross McCall as Technician Fifth Grade Joseph Liebgott

Recurring cast

 Matthew Leitch as Staff Sergeant Floyd Talbert
 Peter Youngblood Hills as Staff Sergeant Darrell "Shifty" Powers
 Nicholas Aaron as Private First Class Robert "Popeye" Wynn
 Philip Barantini as Private Wayne A. "Skinny" Sisk
 Doug Allen as Private Alton More
 George Calil as Sergeant James "Moe" Alley Jr.
 Nolan Hemmings as Staff Sergeant Chuck Grant
 Robin Laing as Private First Class Edward "Babe" Heffron
 Michael Fassbender as Technical Sergeant Burton Christenson
 Tim Matthews as Private First Class Alex Penkala
 Craig Heaney as Private Roy W. Cobb
 Peter McCabe as Corporal Donald Hoobler
 Jamie Bamber as Second Lieutenant Jack E. Foley
 Ben Caplan as Corporal Walter 'Smokey' Gordon
 Mark Huberman as Private Lester A. Hashey
 Phil McKee as Lieutenant Colonel Robert L. Strayer
 Mark Lawrence as Corporal William Dukeman
 Rocky Marshall as Staff Sergeant Earl McClung

Minor

 David Andrews as General Elbridge G. Chapman
 Bill Armstrong as General Anthony McAuliffe
 Jonie Broom as Hans Schmidt
 Doug Cockle as Father John Maloney
 Alexis Conran as George Lavenson
 Dominic Cooper as Allington
 Marcos D'Cruze as Joseph P. Domingus
 Tony Devlin as Ralph R. "Doc" Spina
 Jimmy Fallon as Lt. George C. Rice
 Simon Fenton as Gerald J. Lorraine
 Iain Fletcher as Bernard J. "Doc" Ryan
 Tom George as Private White
 Ezra Godden as Robert van Klinken
 Stephen Graham as Sgt. Myron "Mike" Ranney
 Luke Griffin as Terrence C. "Salty" Harris
 Tom Hardy as Private John Janovec
 Matt Hickey as Private Patrick O'Keefe
 Andrew Howard as Captain Clarence Hester
 Nigel Hoyle as Staff Sergeant Leo Boyle
 Lucie Jeanne as Renée Lemaire
 Corey Johnson as Major Louis Kent
 Marc Ryan-Jordan as John T. Julian
 Wolf Kahler as German General
 John Light as Lieutenant Colonel O. Dobie
 Joseph May as Edward J. Shames
 James McAvoy as Pvt. James W. Miller
 Stephen McCole as Frederick T. "Moose" Heyliger
 Hugo Metsers as John van Kooijk
 Benjamin Montague as Private Matt McDowell
 Hans Georg Nenning as German Baker
 David Nicolle as First Lieutenant Thomas Peacock
 Kieran O'Brien as Private Allen Vest
 Rebecca Okot as Anna the Nurse
 Jason O'Mara as First Lieutenant Thomas Meehan III
 Peter O'Meara as First Lieutenant Norman Dike
 Oscar Pearce as Richard H. Hughes
 Simon Pegg as First Sergeant William S. Evans
 Ben Peyton as Warrant Officer Hill
 Andrew Lee Potts as Eugene E. Jackson
 Dave Power as Rudolph R. Dittrich
 Luke Roberts as Herbert J. Suerth
 Iain Robertson as George Smith
 Toby Ross Bryant as Medic Paul Jones
 Bart Ruspoli as Private Edward Tipper
 Alex Sagba as Francis J. Mellet
 Simon Schatzberger as Private First Class Joseph Lesniewski
 Andrew Scott as Private John "Cowboy" Hall
 Graham Seed as Brigadier General Red Beret
 Adam Sims as John S. Zielinski, Jr.
 Anatole Taubman as Otto Herzfeld
 Stephen Walters as Technician Fifth Grade John "Jack" McGrath, Sr.
 Paul Williams as Private Jack Olsen
 Jonathan Young as Lieutenant John W. Kelley

Production
The series was developed chiefly by Tom Hanks and Erik Jendresen, who spent months detailing the plot outline and individual episodes. Steven Spielberg served as "the final eye" and used Saving Private Ryan, the film on which he and Hanks had collaborated, to inform the series, although Jendresen served as showrunner. Accounts of Easy Company veterans, such as Donald Malarkey, were incorporated into production to add historic detail.

Budget and promotion

Band of Brothers was at the time the most expensive TV miniseries to have been made by any network.  Its budget was about $125 million, or an average of $12.5 million per episode.

An additional $15 million was allocated for a promotional campaign, which included screenings for World War II veterans. One was held at Utah Beach, Normandy, where U.S. troops had landed on June 6, 1944. On June 7, 2001, 47 Easy Company veterans were flown to Paris and then traveled by chartered train to the site, where the series premiered. Chrysler was a sponsor, as its Jeeps were used in the series. Chrysler spent $5 million to $15 million on its advertising campaign, using footage from Band of Brothers. Each of the spots was reviewed and approved by the co-executive producers Hanks and Spielberg.

The BBC paid £7 million ($10.1 million) as co-production partner, the most it had ever paid for a bought-in program, and screened it on BBC Two. Originally, it was to have aired on BBC One but was moved to allow an "uninterrupted ten-week run", with the BBC denying that this was because the series was not sufficiently mainstream. Negotiations were monitored by British Prime Minister Tony Blair, who spoke personally to Spielberg.

Location
The series was shot over eight to ten months on Ellenbrooke Fields, at Hatfield Aerodrome in Hertfordshire, England. Various sets, including replicas of European towns, were built. This location had been used to shoot the film Saving Private Ryan. Replicas were constructed on the large open field to represent twelve different towns, among them Bastogne, Belgium; Eindhoven, Netherlands; and Carentan, France. North Weald Airfield in Essex was used for location shots depicting the take-off sequences before the D-Day Normandy landings.

The village of Hambleden, in Buckinghamshire, England, was used as a location extensively in the early episodes to depict the company's training in England, as well as in later scenes. The scenes set in Germany and Austria were shot in Switzerland, in and near the village of Brienz in the Bernese Oberland, and at the nearby Hotel Giessbach.

Historical accuracy
To preserve historical accuracy, the writers conducted additional research. One source was the memoir of Easy Company soldier David Kenyon Webster, Parachute Infantry: An American Paratrooper's Memoir of D-Day and the Fall of the Third Reich (1994). This was published by LSU Press, following renewed interest in World War II and more than 30 years after his death in a boating accident. In Band of Brothers Ambrose quoted liberally from Webster's unpublished diary entries, with permission from his estate.

The production team consulted Dale Dye, a retired United States Marine Corps captain and consultant on Saving Private Ryan, as well as with most of the surviving Easy Company veterans, including Richard Winters, Bill Guarnere, Frank Perconte, Ed Heffron, and Amos Taylor. Dye (who portrays Colonel Robert Sink) instructed the actors in a 10-day boot camp.

The production aimed for accuracy in the detail of weapons and costumes. Simon Atherton, the weapons master, corresponded with veterans to match weapons to scenes, and assistant costume designer Joe Hobbs used photos and veteran accounts.

Most actors had contact with the individuals they were to portray before filming, often by telephone. Several veterans came to the production site. Hanks acknowledged that alterations were needed to create the series: "We've made history fit onto our screens. We had to condense down a vast number of characters, fold other people's experiences into 10 or 15 people, have people saying and doing things others said or did. We had people take off their helmets to identify them, when they would never have done so in combat. But I still think it is three or four times more accurate than most films like this." As a final accuracy check, the veterans saw previews of the series and approved the episodes before they were aired.

Shortly after the premiere of the series, Tom Hanks asked Major Winters what he thought of Band of Brothers. The major responded, "I wish that it would have been more authentic. I was hoping for an 80 percent solution." Hanks responded, "Look, Major, this is Hollywood. At the end of the day we will be hailed as geniuses if we get this 12 percent right. We are going to shoot for 17 percent."

The liberation of one of the Kaufering subcamps of Dachau was depicted in episode 9 ("Why We Fight"); however, the 101st Airborne Division arrived at Kaufering Lager IV subcamp on the day after it was discovered by the 134th Ordnance Maintenance Battalion of the 12th Armored Division, on April 27, 1945. German historian and Holocaust researcher Anton Posset worked with Steven Spielberg and Tom Hanks as a consultant, providing photographs of the liberators and documentation of the survivor's reports he had collected over the years. The camp was reconstructed in England for the miniseries.

It is uncertain which Allied unit was first to reach the Kehlsteinhaus. Several claim the honor, compounded by confusion with the town of Berchtesgaden, which was taken on May 4 by forward elements of the 7th Infantry Regiment of the 3rd Infantry Division. Reputedly members of the 7th went as far as the elevator to the Kehlsteinhaus, with at least one individual claiming he and a partner continued on to the top. However, the 101st Airborne maintains it was first both to Berchtesgaden and the Kehlsteinhaus. Elements of the French 2nd Armored Division, Laurent Touyeras, Georges Buis and Paul Répiton-Préneuf, were present on the night of May 4 to 5, and took several photographs before leaving on May 10 at the request of US command, and this is supported by testimonies of the Spanish soldiers who went along with them. 

Major Dick Winters, who commanded the 2nd Battalion of the U.S. 506th PIR in May 1945, stated that they entered Berchtesgaden shortly after noon on May 5. He challenged competing claims stating, "If the 7th Infantry Regiment of the 3rd Division was first in Berchtesgaden, just where did they go? Berchtesgaden is a relatively small community. I walked into the Berchtesgaden Hof with Lieutenant Welsh and saw nobody other than some servants. Goering's Officers' Club and wine cellar certainly would have caught the attention of a French soldier from LeClerc's 2nd Armored Division, or a rifleman from the U.S. 3rd Division. I find it hard to imagine, if the 3rd Division was there first, why they left those beautiful Mercedes staff cars untouched for our men."

Reception

Critical reception
Band of Brothers has a 97% approval rating with an average score of 8.80/10 based on 32 reviews from Rotten Tomatoes. The website's critics consensus is, "Band of Brothers offers a visceral, intense look at the horrors of war – and the sacrifices of the millions of ordinary people who served." While on Metacritic, which uses a weighted average, the miniseries received a score of 87 out of 100, based on 28 reviews, indicating "universal acclaim."

CNN's Paul Clinton said that the miniseries "is a remarkable testament to that generation of citizen soldiers, who responded when called upon to save the world for democracy and then quietly returned to build the nation that we now all enjoy, and all too often take for granted". Caryn James of The New York Times called it "an extraordinary 10-part series that masters its greatest challenge: it balances the ideal of heroism with the violence and terror of battle, reflecting what is both civilized and savage about war." James also remarked on the generation gap between most viewers and characters, suggesting this was a significant hurdle. Robert Bianco of USA Today wrote that the series was "significantly flawed and yet absolutely extraordinary—just like the men it portrays," rating the series four out of four stars. He noted however that it was hard to identify with individual characters during crowded battle scenes.

Philip French of The Guardian commented that he had "seen nothing in the cinema this past year that impressed me as much as BBC2's 10-part Band of Brothers, produced by Steven Spielberg and Tom Hanks, and Ken Loach's The Navigators on Channel 4", and that it was "one of the best films ever made about men in war and superior in most ways to Saving Private Ryan." Matt Seaton, also in The Guardian, wrote that the film's production was "on such a scale that in an ad hoc, inadvertent way it gives one a powerful sense of what really was accomplished during the D-Day invasion - the extraordinary logistical effort of moving men and matériel in vast quantities."

Tom Shales of The Washington Post wrote that though the series is "at times visually astonishing," it suffers from "disorganization, muddled thinking and a sense of redundancy." Shales observed that the characters are hard to identify: "Few of the characters stand out strikingly against the backdrop of the war. In fact, this show is all backdrop and no frontdrop. When you watch two hours and still aren't quite sure who the main characters are, something is wrong."

Band of Brothers has become a benchmark for World War II series. The German series Generation War, for example, was characterized by critics as Band of Brüder (the German word for "Brothers").

Ratings
Band of Brothers September 9, 2001 premiere drew 10 million viewers. Two days later, the September 11 attacks occurred, and HBO immediately ceased its marketing campaign. Hence, while the second episode drew 7.2 million viewers, the last episode received 5.1 million viewers, the smallest audience.

Awards and nominations
The series was nominated for twenty Primetime Emmy Awards, and won seven, including Outstanding Miniseries and Outstanding Directing for a Miniseries, Movie, or Dramatic Special. It also won the Golden Globe Award for Best Miniseries or Motion Picture Made for Television, American Film Institute Award for TV Movie or Miniseries of the Year, Producers Guild of America Award for Outstanding Producer of Long-Form Television, and the TCA Award for Outstanding Achievement in Movies, Miniseries, and Specials. 

The show was selected for a Peabody Award for ' ... relying on both history and memory to create a new tribute to those who fought to preserve liberty.' In September 2019, The Guardian ranked the show 68th on its list of the 100 best TV shows of the 21st century, stating that it "expanded the horizons – and budgets – of prestige TV".

Primetime Emmy Awards

Golden Globe Awards

Home media
The miniseries was released on VHS and DVD box sets on November 5, 2002. The DVD set has five discs containing all ten episodes, and a bonus disc with the behind-the-scenes documentary We Stand Alone Together: The Men of Easy Company and the video diary of actor Ron Livingston, who played Lewis Nixon. A collector's edition of the box set was also released, containing the same discs in a tin case instead of cardboard. , Band of Brothers was one of the best-selling TV DVD sets, having sold about $250 million worth.

The series was released as an exclusive HD DVD TV series in Japan in 2007. With the demise of the format, they went out of production. A Blu-ray Disc version of Band of Brothers was released on November 11, 2008, and has become a Blu-ray Disc top seller.

See also

 The Pacific
 Masters of the Air
 Battleground, a 1949 film that followed a company of the 327th Glider Infantry Regiment, 101st Airborne Division during the siege of Bastogne.

Notes

References

Bibliography

Further reading
A number of books give further insight into Easy Company:
  Part travelogue, part historical perspective.
  Profiles of deceased Easy Company men by their family members.

  Oral history featuring 20 surviving members of Easy Company.
  Recounts Compton's career as an attorney and prosecutor of Sirhan Sirhan.
 
 
 
  A limited edition coffee table book.
  Published posthumously.
  A collection of Guth's war time pictures and memoirs.

External links

 
 
 
 
 Bill Guarnere and Babe Heffron discuss their experience as part of the Band of Brothers 
 Mark Bando's Band of Brothers pages (Bando is a prolific historian of the 101st Airborne)
 Film of the U.S. Army: liberation of the concentration camp Kaufering IV (by Landsberg Lech), in April 1945: This film and the photos, made by the U.S. Army, served as a template for Part 9 Band of Brothers. These documents were given to the team of director and producer Steven Spielberg and Tom Hanks by the European Holocaust Memorial (Landsberg).

101st Airborne Division
2000s American television miniseries
2001 American television series debuts
2001 American television series endings
American action television series
American biographical series
BBC television dramas
Best Miniseries or Television Movie Golden Globe winners
English-language television shows
HBO original programming
American military television series
Peabody Award-winning television programs
Primetime Emmy Award for Outstanding Miniseries winners
Primetime Emmy Award-winning television series
Television series based on actual events
Television series by Home Box Office
Television series by DreamWorks Television
Television shows based on non-fiction books
World War II television drama series
Television series by Playtone
Fiction about the United States Army
Television series set in 1944
Television series set in 1945
Television series about the United States Army